Here Comes the Band is an album by Trinidadian Soca artist Machel Montano and his band Xtatik released in 2000. The album's 22 tracks feature different singers on each, with the album covering a diverse range of styles. Allmusic writer Jason Birchmeier gave it a 3-star review, while in World Music: The Rough Guide, the authors view that "the 10 or so tracks that really work are great".

Track listing
"Millennium (Intro)"
"Here Comes the Band" - Machel Montano
"Manners" - Farmer Nappy & Derwin Vallie
"Water Flowing" - Machel Montano (featuring Farmer Nappy)
"Drag Yuh Bow" - Peter C. Lewis
"Break Bottle" - Farmer Nappy (featuring Denise Belfon)
"Kiki" - Peter C. Lewis (featuring Lexxus & CL Smooth)
"Disco Grand Daddy" - Lord Nelson
"Shake That Business" - Kerwin Vallie
"Do You Know" - Yardmen College
"Bumper Carz (Back Up Back Up)" - Mr. Cash & Machel Montano (featuring Farmer Nappy)
"Agoni" - Peter C. Lewis
"Play Whe" - Lord Nelson
"Oh My Gosh" - Peter C. Lewis & Bigga
"People Business" - Shawn Bailey
"Free Yuh Mind" - Youth Promotion Crew
"Turn It Up" - Peter C. Lewis
"Jab Jab Re-Incarnation" - Ken Hunter (featuring The Laventille Rhythm Section)
"Five Kind of Wine" - Peter C. Lewis
"Going the Distance" - Yardmen College
"La Diablesse" - Shawn Bailey
"Biggie" - Lord Nelson

References

Machel Montano albums
2000 albums